Qiongzhou may refer to:

Qiongzhou Strait (琼州海峡), Chinese strait between Leizhou Peninsula, Guangdong and Hainan
Qiongzhou Bridge (琼州大桥), a bridge over Nandu River in Haikou, Hainan, China
Qiongzhou University (琼州学院), a university in Sanya, Hainan, China

Historical prefectures
Qiong Prefecture (Sichuan) (邛州), a prefecture between the 6th and 20th centuries in modern Sichuan, China
Qiong Prefecture (Hainan) (瓊州), a prefecture between the 7th and 14th centuries in modern Hainan, China